The Architect of the City of Paris (Architecte de la ville de Paris) is the incumbent of a municipal position, responsible for the design and construction of civic projects in Paris.

In the Ancien Régime in France, the position of Bâtiments du Roi oversaw the construction and maintenance of the King's properties in and around Paris. This position lasted from 1620 through 1789. The Architect's position, accountable to the municipal government, was established after the French Revolution.

Most if not all of Paris's official architects were drawn from the graduates of the École nationale supérieure des Beaux-Arts. Multiple architects may hold the title at any one time. Through the early 1900s the duties encompassed what would today be considered a mix of architecture, urban planning, civil engineering, historic preservation, and traffic management—for instance, during his tenure in 1907, Eugene Henard developed the first modern roundabout in France at the Place de l'Étoile.

Architects of the City of Paris 
 Bernard Poyet, c. 1791
 Étienne-Hippolyte Godde, 1818–1830
 , 1833–1872
 Émile Gilbert, c. 1845
 Victor Baltard, c. 1849
 Léon Ginain, c. 1860
 Alfred-Philibert Aldrophe, c. 1874
 Louis Bonnier, c. 1884
 Eugène Hénard, c. 1906–07
 Léon Azéma, c. 1928
 Joseph Auguste Émile Vaudremer
 Henri Gautruche

References 

 
 
Government of Paris
 
1791 establishments in France